Ein Schritt weiter is an East German film. It was released in 1953.

External links
 

1953 films
East German films
1950s German-language films
German black-and-white films
German documentary films
1953 documentary films
1950s German films